A Case for PC 49 is a 1951 British mystery film directed by Francis Searle and starring Brian Reece, Joy Shelton and Christine Norden. It was made by Hammer Films at Bray Studios. The film was based on a popular radio series, which already been adapted into the 1949 production The Adventures of PC 49. It was released as a second feature.

Cast
 Brian Reece as Archibald Berkeley-Willoughby 
 Joy Shelton as Joan Carr  
 Christine Norden as Della Dainton  
 Leslie Bradley as Victor Palantine 
 George McLeod as Inspector Wilson  
 Campbell Singer as Sgt. Wright  
 Jack Stewart as Cutler  
 Michael Balfour as Chubby Price  
 Michael Ripper as George Steele 
 Joan Seton as Elsie  
 Edna Morris as Mrs. Bott 
 John Sharp as Desk Sergeant 
 Frank Hawkins as Police Sergeant  
 John Barry as Pewter 
 John Warren as Coffee Dan

References

Bibliography
 Chibnall, Steve & McFarlane, Brian. The British 'B' Film. Palgrave MacMillan, 2009.

External links

1951 films
British mystery films
1950s mystery films
Films directed by Francis Searle
Films set in London
Films based on radio series
British sequel films
Hammer Film Productions films
1950s police films
1950s police procedural films
British police films
British black-and-white films
1950s English-language films
1950s British films